Euphorbia halemanui (syn. Chamaesyce halemanui) is a rare species of flowering plant in the euphorb family known by the common name Kauai sandmat. It is endemic to Kauai, Hawaii, where there are no more than 400 plants remaining. There are four populations at last count. It is a federally listed endangered species.

This is a shrub with vining, climbing stems that bleed a milky sap. The inflorescence is a single cyathium or a dense cluster of many. It and other Hawaiian euphorbs perform C4 carbon fixation.

This rare plant grows in moist forested slopes on Kauai. The forests are often dominated by koa (Acacia koa) and ōhia lehua (Metrosideros polymorpha). In other areas it grows alongside kauila (Alphitonia ponderosa), hame (Antidesma platyphyllum), aalii (Dodonaea viscosa), Kauai kokio (Kokia kauaiensis), and other native plants.

References

External links
The Nature Conservancy

halemanui
Endemic flora of Hawaii
Biota of Kauai
Plants described in 1936